Marcel Pertry (19 April 1921 in Vlamertinge – 10 April 2008 in Bruges) is a Belgian former football player. Pertry is especially remembered for his goalscoring abilities. Pertry is also Cercle Brugge's all-time top scorer.

Pertry was transferred from his local team SK Vlamertinge to Cercle Brugge in 1943. He made his debut in a 2–2 home draw against Lyra, scoring once. Pertry would especially remember his début because when he was waiting in Ypres for his train to Bruges, some members of the Flemish National Union's Black Brigade passed by. One stepped out of his group, went towards Pertry and hit him in the face, telling that the mockery with the Black Brigade should stop once and for all. Pertry didn't know what he had done wrong. Probably, he just had a big smile on his face while looking forward towards his first match at the highest level of Belgian football.

Pertry ended his career as football player with Cercle Ieper, but would return to Cercle Brugge as youth coach. Before the 1966–67 season, Cercle Brugge were looking for a new head coach. Marcel Pertry (assistant manager at that time) and Urbain Braems were the biggest candidates for the vacant position. Both had to give to the Cercle board their vision about football and how they would implement it in the training sessions. But due to the Cercle board not reaching a consensus, Frenchman Jules Van Dooren was finally chosen.

Further reading
Roland Podevijn, Cercle Brugge 1899–1989, K.S.V. Cercle Brugge, 1989, p. 91–119

External links
Cerclemuseum.be 

1921 births
2008 deaths
Belgian footballers
Association football forwards
Cercle Brugge K.S.V. players
Belgian football managers
Belgian Pro League players
Sportspeople from Ypres
Footballers from West Flanders